Live at River Plate is a live album by Australian hard rock band AC/DC, released on 19 November 2012.

The album was recorded during AC/DC's Black Ice World Tour on 4 December 2009 at River Plate Stadium in Buenos Aires. Video footage from the same concert was previously officially released in May 2011 on DVD and Blu-ray as Live at River Plate. This is the band's final live album to feature original rhythm guitarist and co-founder Malcolm Young before his retirement in 2014 due to his health and death in 2017.

Critical and commercial response
The album received mixed to positive reviews from publications such as Allmusic, for which Stephen Thomas Erlewine stated that while the band's vocalist, "Brian Johnson[,] sounds a little worse for wear" still "the brothers Young, Cliff Williams, and Phil Rudd remain as solid as a boulder". Newer songs such as "Rock 'n' Roll Train", in Erlewine's opinion, fit in perfectly alongside AC/DC's earlier work that that group continues to play. He praised the band overall for providing "a heavy dose of heavy rock & roll" even after decades of performing.

With the release of Live at River Plate in the U.K., the top ten of the U.K. Rock & Metal Singles chart was composed of all AC/DC songs. "Back in Black", "Highway to Hell", "You Shook Me All Night Long", "Thunderstruck", "Whole Lotta Rosie", "Shoot to Thrill", "Hells Bells", "It's a Long Way to the Top (If You Wanna Rock 'n' Roll)", "For Those About to Rock (We Salute You)", and "T.N.T." all charted within the top ten in corresponding order. In particular, several songs in the chart were actually the studio versions. This resulted from the move of having all of AC/DC's albums being re-released on iTunes at the time of Live at River Plate's release.

Track listing
All tracks written by Angus Young, Malcolm Young and Bon Scott; except where noted.

Personnel
Brian Johnson – lead vocals
Angus Young – lead guitar, backing vocals in T.N.T and Dirty Deeds Done Dirt Cheap.
Malcolm Young – rhythm guitar, backing vocals
Cliff Williams – bass guitar, backing vocals
Phil Rudd – drums

Chart performance

Weekly charts

Year-end charts

Decade-end charts

Certifications

See also
AC/DC discography
 Live at River Plate (live concert film)

References

2012 live albums
AC/DC live albums
Columbia Records live albums
Live albums recorded in Buenos Aires